The Mexican amberwing (Perithemis intensa) is a dragonfly of the family Libellulidae, native to the southwestern United States and Mexico.

References

External links
 Mexican amberwing at Arizona Dragonflies

Libellulidae
Odonata of North America
Insects of Mexico
Insects of the United States
Fauna of the Southwestern United States
Insects described in 1889